Kandahar is a hamlet in Rural Municipality of Big Quill No. 308, Saskatchewan, Canada. Listed as a designated place by Statistics Canada, the hamlet had a population of 20 in the Canada 2016 Census. Located on Highway 16 near Wynyard, Saskatchewan, the community was named by Canadian Pacific Railway executives in the late 19th century for a British military victory in Kandahar, Afghanistan. The hamlet is too small to be enumerated on its own, so its population belongs to the Rural Municipality of Big Quill No. 308. It is located near the south shore of Big Quill Lake, the largest inland body of salt water in Canada.

History

Many of the first settlers in the Kandahar district were immigrants from Iceland or of Icelandic descent. A significant number arrived from the Argyle settlement in Manitoba. An Icelandic immigrant, Thorvidur Halldorson (born Þorviður Magnússon), served as the district's first postmaster in 1910. From 1910 to 1913, the spelling of the post office was Candahar. Kandahar became a village in 1913, following a petition from its inhabitants. In 1925, Kandahar was listed as a Canadian Pacific Railway Ltd. Station on the Minnedosa, Saskatoon, Edmonton Section, CPR. Businesses included a printing press, Prentsmiðja A. Helgasonar, run by Andres Helgason (1867-1939), who was a skilled bookbinder and printer.

The one room school house was named Kandahar School District #3333.

Until the 1970s, Kandahar was a thriving town with various stores and attractions, including a popular steak house. However, in the late 1980s the village's only school closed, and the population has steadily decreased since.

Demographics 

See also 

 List of communities in Saskatchewan
 Hamlets of Saskatchewan
 Designated place

References

Big Quill No. 308, Saskatchewan
Designated places in Saskatchewan
Organized hamlets in Saskatchewan
Icelandic settlements in Saskatchewan
Division No. 10, Saskatchewan